The 1988 United States Senate Election in Maryland was held on November 8, 1988. Incumbent Democratic U.S. Senator Paul Sarbanes was reelected to a third term in a landslide. Sarbanes won deep red Garrett County, which has never supported a Democratic presidential candidate and has not voted Democratic in a Senate election since this election.

Candidates

Democratic 
 Paul Sarbanes, incumbent U.S. Senator

Republican 
 Alan Keyes, former Assistant Secretary of State for International Organization Affairs

Results

Results by county

See also
1988 United States Senate elections
1988 United States elections

References

Notes

1988
Maryland
United States Senate